BHO can refer to:

Barack Hussein Obama II, 44th president of the United States (2009–2017)
Barack Hussein Obama, Sr., father of Barack Hussein Obama II
Bhojpuri language (ISO 639 alpha-3, bho)
Bibliotheca Hagiographica Orientalis
Blackhorse Road station (National Rail station code BHO)
British History Online
Browser Helper Object
Butane hash oil
 Raja Bhoj Airport IATA code